Easton is a town in Grafton County, New Hampshire, United States. The population was 292 at the 2020 census.

History 
Formed from a part of Landaff known as East Landaff, Easton was incorporated in 1876. Kinsman Mountain, the Kinsman Range, and Kinsman Notch are named for Nathaniel Kinsman, one of the original settlers.

Geography 
The west-flowing Wild Ammonoosuc River drains the southern part of town, while the north-flowing Ham Branch of the Gale River drains the northern portion and passes the town's village. Easton lies fully within the Connecticut River watershed. The Kinsman Range of the White Mountains occupies the eastern side of the town, with the ridgecrest to the east in the town of Lincoln.

New Hampshire Route 116 crosses the town from north to south, passing through the town center. New Hampshire Route 112 crosses the southern part of the town from east to west, following the Wild Ammonoosuc River.

Demographics 

At the 2000 census there were 256 people, 117 households, and 84 families living in the town.  The population density was 8.2 people per square mile (3.2/km).  There were 187 housing units at an average density of 6.0 per square mile (2.3/km).  The racial makeup of the town was 96.48% White, 0.78% Native American, and 2.73% from two or more races. Hispanic or Latino of any race were 0.78%.

Of the 117 households 23.9% had children under the age of 18 living with them, 58.1% were married couples living together, 10.3% had a female householder with no husband present, and 28.2% were non-families. 23.1% of households were one person and 6.8% were one person aged 65 or older.  The average household size was 2.19 and the average family size was 2.54.

The age distribution was 19.1% under the age of 18, 3.9% from 18 to 24, 22.3% from 25 to 44, 35.2% from 45 to 64, and 19.5% 65 or older.  The median age was 47 years. For every 100 females, there were 98.4 males.  For every 100 females age 18 and over, there were 97.1 males.

The median household income was $49,167 and the median family income  was $69,375. Males had a median income of $41,875 versus $23,750 for females. The per capita income for the town was $31,841.  About 6.0% of families and 10.0% of the population were below the poverty line, including 30.6% of those under the age of eighteen and none of those sixty five or over.

Notable people 

 Bode Miller (born 1977), Olympic gold medalist skier; born in Easton

References

External links
 
 New Hampshire Economic and Labor Market Information Bureau Profile

Towns in Grafton County, New Hampshire
Towns in New Hampshire